Lost is the first solo album by American hip hop artist Cool Calm Pete. Originally released in the United States via Embedded Records in 2005, it was re-released with additional bonus tracks in Europe via Definitive Jux in 2006.

Reception
Stewart Mason of AllMusic gave the album 4 stars out of 5, calling it "a trippy blend of incredibly obscure samples, found dialogue, loosey-goosey beats that never break a sweat, and often-amusing lyrics delivered in an offhand style somewhere between Kanye West's peculiarly off-kilter rhythms and Mike Skinner's conversational casualness."

Track listing

References

External links
 

2005 albums
Definitive Jux albums